The Mammalia in the 10th edition of Systema Naturae forms one of six classes of animals in Carl Linnaeus's tenth reformed edition written in Latin.
The following explanations are based on William Turton's translations who rearranged and corrected earlier editions published by Johann Friedrich Gmelin, Johan Christian Fabricius and Carl Ludwig Willdenow:
<blockquote>Animals that suckle their young by means of lactiferous teats. In external and internal structure they resemble man: most of them are quadrupeds; and with man, their natural enemy, inhabit the surface of the Earth. The largest, though fewest in number, inhabit the ocean.</blockquote>
Linnaeus divided the mammals based upon the number, situation, and structure of their teeth; mammals have the following characteristics:

Heart: two auricles, 2 ventricles. Warm, dark red blood;
Lungs: respires alternately;
Jaw: incombent, covered. Teeth usually within jaw;
Teats: lactiferous;
Organs of sense: tongue, nostrils, eyes, ears, and papillae of the skin;
Covering: hair, which is scanty in warm climates, hardly any on aquatics;
Supports: four feet, except in aquatics; and in most a tail. Walks on the Earth and speaks.
Oldfield Thomas scrutinized Linnaeus's chapter on mammals in 1911 and attempted to find missing type species and type localities.

 Primates 
Primates have four cutting upper parallel fore-teeth, except in some bat species which have two or none; solitary tusks in each jaw, one on each side; two pectoral teats; two feet and hands; flattened, oval nails; and they eat fruits.HomoHomo sapiensHomo americanusHomo europaeusHomo asiaticusHomo aferHomo monstrosusHomo troglodytes – partly based on myth, partly on orangutansSimiaSimia satyrus – common chimpanzee and Bornean orangutanSimia sylvanus – Barbary macaqueSimia sphinx – mandrillSimia apedia – nomen dubiumSimia silenus – lion-tailed macaqueSimia faunus – species cannot be determinedSimia paniscus – red-faced spider monkeySimia diana – Diana monkeySimia cephus – moustached guenonSimia aygula – nomen oblitum for the crab-eating macaqueSimia hamadryas – hamadryas baboonSimia jacchus – common marmosetSimia oedipus – cottontop tamarinSimia aethiops – grivetSimia midas – red-handed tamarinSimia cynamolgos – possibly crab-eating macaqueSimia apella – tufted capuchinSimia morta – nomen dubiumSimia capucina – white-headed capuchinSimia sciurea – common squirrel monkeySimia syrichta – Philippine tarsierLemurLemur tardigradus – red slender lorisLemur catta – ring-tailed lemurLemur volans – Philippine flying lemurVespertilioVespertilio vampyrus – large flying foxVespertilio spectrum – spectral vampire batVespertilio perspicillatus – Seba's short-tailed batVespertilio spasma – lesser false vampire batVespertilio leporinus – greater bulldog batVespertilio auritus – brown long-eared batVespertilio murinus – parti-coloured bat

 Bruta 
Bruta do not have fore-teeth, but tusks, feet with strong hoof-like nails; move slowly and eat mostly masticated vegetables.ElephasElephas maximus – Asian elephantTrichechusTrichechus manatus – West Indian manateeBradypusBradypus tridactylus – pale-throated slothBradypus didactylus – Linnaeus's two-toed slothMyrmecophagaMyrmecophaga didactyla – silky anteaterMyrmecophaga tridactyla – giant anteaterMyrmecophaga tetradactyla – southern tamanduaManisManis pentadactyla – Chinese pangolin

 Ferae 
Ferae usually have six conic fore-teeth in each jaw, longer tusks, grinders with conic projections, feet with subulate claws, and feed on carcasses and prey on other animals.PhocaPhoca ursina – northern fur sealPhoca leonina – southern elephant sealPhoca rosmarus – walrusPhoca vitulina – harbour sealCanisCanis familiaris – domestic dogCanis lupus – grey wolfCanis hyaena – striped hyenaCanis vulpes – red foxCanis alopex – species cannot be determinedCanis lagopus – Arctic foxCanis aureus – golden jackalFelisFelis leo – lionFelis tigris – tigerFelis pardus – leopardFelis onca – jaguarFelis pardalis – ocelotFelis catus – domestic catFelis lynx – Eurasian lynxViverraViverra ichneumon – Egyptian mongooseViverra mephitis – striped skunkViverra putorius – eastern spotted skunkViverra zibetha – large Indian civetViverra genetta – common genetMustela (weasels, otters, and martens)Mustela lutris – sea otterMustela lutra – Eurasian river otterMustela gulo – wolverineMustela barbara – tayraMustela martes – European pine martenMustela putorius – wild ferretMustela furo – ferretMustela zibellina – sableMustela erminea – stoatMustela lutreola – European minkUrsusUrsus arctos – brown bearUrsus luscus – wolverineUrsus meles – Eurasian badgerUrsus lotor – northern raccoon

 Bestiae 

Bestiae have indefinite numbers of fore-teeth on the sides, always one extra canine, an elongate nose used to dig out juicy roots and vermin.

Sus (pigs)Sus scrofa – wild boarSus porcus – red river hogSus tajacu – collared peccarySus babyrusa – Buru babirusaDasypusDasypus unicinctus – southern naked-tailed armadilloDasypus tricinctus – Brazilian three-banded armadilloDasypus quadricinctus − synonym of tricinctusDasypus sexcinctus – six-banded armadilloDasypus septemcinctus – seven-banded armadilloDasypus novemcinctus – nine-banded armadilloErinaceusErinaceus europaeus – European hedgehogTalpaTalpa europaea – European moleTalpa asiatica – Cape golden moleSorexSorex araneus – common shrewSorex cristatus – star-nosed moleSorex aquaticus – eastern moleDidelphisDidelphis marsupialis – common opossumDidelphis philander – bare-tailed woolly opossumDidelphis opossum – grey four-eyed opossumDidelphis murina – Linnaeus's mouse opossumDidelphis dorsigera − synonym of murina Glires 

Glires have two cutting fore-teeth in each jaw, but no tusks, feet with claws formed for running and bounding, and eat bark, roots, and vegetables, which they gnaw.RhinocerosRhinoceros unicornis – Indian rhinocerosRhinoceros bicornis – black rhinoceros

HystrixHystrix cristata – crested porcupineHystrix prehensilis – Brazilian porcupineHystrix dorsata – North American porcupineHystrix macroura – Asiatic brush-tailed porcupineHystrix brachyura – Malayan porcupineLepusLepus timidus – common hareLepus cuniculus – European rabbitLepus capensis – Cape hareLepus brasiliensis – Common tapetí

CastorCastor fiber – European beaverCastor moschatus – Russian desman

MusMus porcellus – Guinea pigMus leporinus – red-rumped agoutiMus lemmus – Norway lemmingMus marmota – Alpine marmotMus monax – groundhogMus cricetus – European hamsterMus terrestrisMus amphibius – European water voleMus rattus – black ratMus musculus – house mouseMus avellanarius – hazel dormouseMus sylvaticus – wood mouseMus striatus – typical striped grass mouseMus longipes - [nomen dubium, no type specimen specified]Mus jaculus – lesser Egyptian jerboaMus volans – southern flying squirrelSciurusSciurus vulgaris – red squirrel Sciurus niger – fox squirrel Sciurus cinereus – Delmarva fox squirrel Sciurus flavus – [nomen dubium]Sciurus getulus – Barbary ground squirrelSciurus striatus – eastern chipmunkSciurus volans – Siberian flying squirrel

 Pecora 
Pecora do not have upper, not many lower cutting fore-teeth, hoofed, cloven feet, and feed on herbs which they pluck, chewing the cud; four stomachs, a paunch for macerating and ruminating food, a bonnet for reticulating and receiving it, an omasus or maniplies of numerous folds for digesting it, and an abomasus or caille, fasciate, for giving it acescency and preventing putrefaction.CamelusCamelus dromedarius – dromedary camel Camelus bactrianus – domestic Bactrian camelCamelus glama – domestic llamaCamelus pacos – domestic alpacaMoschusMoschus moschiferus – Siberian musk deerCervusCervus camelopardalis – giraffeCervus alces – elkCervus elaphus – red deer Cervus tarandus – reindeerCervus dama – fallow deerCervus bezoarticus – pampas deerCervus capreolus – roe deerCervus guineensis – [nomen dubium]

CapraCapra hircus – goatCapra ibex – Alpine ibexCapra rupicapra – chamoisCapra depressa – cannot be determinedCapra reversa – cannot be determinedCapra pygmea – royal antelope Capra gazella – gemsbokCapra cervicapra – blackbuckCapra dorcas – dorcas gazelleCapra grimmia – common duikerCapra mambrica – a long-eared domestic goat from SyriaCapra ammon – argaliOvisOvis aries – domestic sheepOvis guineensis – domestic sheep from GuineaOvis strepsiceros – domestic sheep from CreteBosBos taurus – cowBos bonasus – European bisonBos bison – American bisonBos bubalis – domestic water buffaloBos indicus – zebu

 Bellua 

Bellua have obtuse fore-teeth, hoofed feet, move heavily, and feed on vegetables.

EquusEquus caballus – horseEquus asinus – donkeyEquus zebra – mountain zebraHippopotamusHippopotamus amphibius – hippopotamusHippopotamus terrestris – South American tapir

 Cete 
Cete have some cartilaginous, some bony teeth, no nostrils but a fistulous opening in the anterior and upper part of the head, pectoral fins instead of feet, horizontal, flattened tails, no claws, live in the ocean, and feed on mollusca and fish.MonodonMonodon monoceros – narwhalBalaenaBalaena mysticetus – bowhead whaleBalaena physalus – fin whaleBalaena boops – possibly a synonym of physalusBalaena musculus – blue whalePhyseterPhyseter catodon – either Beluga or sperm whalePhyseter macrocephalus sperm whalePhyseter miscropsPhyseter tursio – possibly a mystical animalDelphinusDelphinus phocoena – harbour porpoiseDelphinus delphis – short-beaked common dolphin Delphinus orca'' – orca

References

Footnotes

Systema Naturae
 Systema Naturae, Mammalia